The Cadillac Palace Theatre (originally known as the New Palace Theatre) is operated by Broadway In Chicago, a Nederlander company. It is located at 151 West Randolph Street in the Chicago Loop area.

History
The theater opened in 1926 as the New Palace Theatre with Roger Wolfe Kahn and his Orchestra topping the bill. It was built at a cost of $12 million as part of the Eitel Block Project.  In 1984, the theater was renamed the Bismarck Theatre and turned into a rock venue.  In 1999, it was renovated and renamed the Cadillac Palace Theatre after Cadillac purchased naming rights.  It currently has maximum capacity of 2,344 people.  Since this reopening it has been home to many pre-broadway hits.  Broadway In Chicago which has allowed for more Broadway hits to tour through Chicago causing a great economic impact on the city of Chicago.

Architecture

The Rapp Brothers, George and Cornelius, were responsible for the design of the Cadillac Palace Theatre. The two men were also the architects behind the Nederlander Theatre and the Chicago Theatre, as well as dozens of other theaters around the country. Their inspiration for the look and feel of the Palace Theatre came from the Fontainebleau and the Palace of Versailles, both found in France. The interior includes huge decorative mirrors, breche violet and white marble. The walls inside are adorned with gold leafing and wood decorations, as well as a series of complex arches and detailed brass ornamentation.

Restoration
During World War II the United States government went around to most theaters and confiscated all the brass which it recycled for war materiels. At the time, the owners of the Palace Theatre painted all the brass in the theater white, so that when the government came in, they were tricked into thinking the theater contained no brass. The brass was left this way and generally forgotten until the recent renovation, when the paint was removed and the rare brass ornamentation was rediscovered and restored to its original condition.

General interest 

The theater opened as part of vaudeville's Orpheum Circuit.  As part of the Orpheum Circuit, the theater presented such stars as Jimmy Durante, Mae West, Jack Benny, Sophie Tucker, and Bob Hope. After the loss of interest in vaudeville, the theater was converted into a movie palace in 1931.

Notable productions
The Cadillac Palace became home to pre-Broadway tours and world premieres with the opening of Elton John and Tim Rice's Aida in the autumn of 1999. This was the beginning of many Broadway-caliber shows to pass through the Cadillac Palace. Mel Brooks's The Producers premiered in Chicago starring Nathan Lane and Matthew Broderick in February 2001. In October 2006 The Pirate Queen made its premiere. Oprah Winfrey presents The Color Purple sat down for its long-run from April to September 2007. In March 2009, the national tour of Mary Poppins began its premier engagement at the Cadillac Palace. Shrek The Musical launched its national tour there from July 13-September 5, 2010. Beginning December 1, 2010, Wicked played a limited return engagement on its first national tour, playing through January 23, 2011.

References

External links
 Broadway In Chicago
Theatre history
Chicago Theater Guide

Theatres in Chicago
Movie palaces
Cadillac